Alex Winitsky (December 27, 1924 – November 14, 2019) was an American real estate developer and film producer. He frequently worked with fellow producer Arlene Sellers.

References

1924 births
2019 deaths
People from Brooklyn
New York University alumni
Loyola Law School alumni
American film producers